Anaeroarcus is a Gram-negative, non-spore-forming, chemoorganotroph and motile bacterial genus from the family of Sporomusaceae, with one known species (Anaeroarcus burkinensis).

References

Negativicutes
Monotypic bacteria genera
Bacteria genera